Erikssonia cooksoni, the Cookson's copper, is a butterfly of the family Lycaenidae. The species was first described by Hamilton Herbert Druce in 1905. It is found in the Democratic Republic of the Congo (Lualaba) and north-western Zambia. It is found in sparse miombo woodland with low herbs.

Adults are on wing in September and January. It looks very much like a slow-flying Acraea, of which it is very likely a Müllerian mimic. Males have a slow, fluttering flight (so mainly the upperside orange is seen) and after a short time settle on twigs, dead grass stems and occasionally elevated ground. They have definite territories and fight off other males that come within the territory: it is only during this fighting that their flight is rapid. They can fly fast if alarmed. Females have a slow, fluttering flight. They flutter through the bush looking for suitable plants on which to oviposit, and if they encounter other flowering herbs, they will stop and feed. The females stop often and sit on dead twigs of herbs. Once the females have located the food plant, they crawl up and down the plant ovipositing on the leaves, stems and dead twigs.

The larvae feed on Gnidia involucrata.

External links
Taxonomy, Biology, Biogeography, Evolution and Conservation of the Genus Erikssonia Trimen (Lepidoptera: Lycaenidae)

Butterflies described in 1905
Erikssonia (butterfly)